North Greece is a hamlet in Monroe County, New York, United States. North Greece has a post office with ZIP code 14515.

References

Hamlets in Monroe County, New York
Hamlets in New York (state)